Goodbye, Kankee is a 1984 role-playing game adventure for Star Ace published by Pacesetter.

Contents
Goodbye, Kankee is the first in a series of modules for Star Ace, and begin with the player characters on a job-hunt.

Reception
Steve Crow reviewed Goodbye, Kankee in Space Gamer No. 75. Crow commented that "I would definitely recommend Goodbye, Kankee to anyone looking for a good time or anyone wanting to get an idea of how sf games (not necessarily Star Ace) should be handled.  The uniqueness of the Star Ace background/history and aliens might make this a bit difficult for adaption to other games, but the premise of this adventure can be used almost anywhere."

References

Role-playing game supplements introduced in 1984
Science fiction role-playing game adventures